Gu-Am High School is a high school that is located in Daegu in South Korea.

Symbol of school
The flower that symbolizes the school is Japanese apricot flower, which indicates elegant figure, noble dignity, elegant curve beauty. The tree is T. caespitosa, which means strong patience, vitality, firm spirit and integrity, stubborn intention and eternity.

History
The school was approved on February 25 1997, and the first entrance ceremony was held on March 17 1997.

References
 

Educational institutions established in 1997
High schools in Daegu
1997 establishments in South Korea